Think Tank (1994-2010) — also known as Think Tank with Ben Wattenberg — was a discussion program that aired on Public Broadcasting Service (PBS), hosted by Ben Wattenberg. Andrew Walworth was co-creator and executive producer. The program was a co-production of New River Media and BJW Inc.

In addition to its weekly half-hour broadcast, Think Tank produced a number of special editions, including The First Measured Century, a three-hour documentary series and Heaven On Earth: The Rise and Fall of Socialism (2005), a three-hour documentary series on the history of socialism, based on the book of the same title by Joshua Muravchik. The series aired from 1994 to 2010.

External links
Official Think Tank Page
Archive of full-length episodes on video

References

1994 American television series debuts
1990s American television talk shows
2000s American television talk shows
2010s American television talk shows
PBS original programming
2010 American television series endings